Andrew Hughes, better known as Semothy Jones or Sem for short, is an English songwriter and record producer from Islington, London.

The earliest releases from Sem were around 2005, a grime instrumental mixtape series called 'Delivery Boy'.

In 2009, Semothy was asked to help promote Timbaland's new Beaterator software in the UK.

In 2010, Semothy signed a three-year publishing deal with Major Music/BMG Publishing and became part of the Biffco/Biff Stannard songwriting/production team.

NME Top 20 Hottest Producers 2010
Semothy Jones was listed by NME as one of the 'Top 20 Hottest Producers' in October 2010. Some of the other names in the bill were Mark Ronson, Dr Luke, RedOne and Rick Rubin.

Gain Ctrl
Semothy Jones is the founder of Gain Ctrl, a free youth music project that started early 2014.

The Realness Theatre Show
Several tracks from the 2014 Maggie Norris directed production 'The Realness' were written by Kath Gotts and produced by Semothy Jones. The show ran over two months later 2014 and received much praise from critics and the press "The production blazes up its grimy streets powered by pure passion.” The Times

Chart success
 No. 1 Album Up All Night – US Billboard 200 – Programming
 No. 2 Album Alive Till I'm Dead – UK Albums Chart – Co-writing and production
 No. 5 Single "Just Be Good To Green" – UK Singles Chart – Co-writing and production
 No. 5 Album Hands – UK Albums Chart; No. 5 European Top 100 – Production
 No. 20 Album Gloves – Australian ARIA Albums Chart – Co-writing

Discography

Singles and album

2007
The Mitchell Brothers Dressed for the Occasion – The Beats
 "Bestest Man" – Co-production, composer

2008
GoldieLocks Bear Safe EP – Locked On
 "Wrapped" – Producer, composer
 "Smash & Grab" – Producer, co-writer

2009
Little Boots Hands – 679/Atlantic Records
 "Tune into My Heart" – Producer

2010
Professor Green Alive Till I'm Dead – Virgin Records
 "Just Be Good To Green" feat Lily Allen – Producer, co-writer

Operator Please Gloves – Virgin Records/Brille Records
 "Catapult" –  Co-writing
 "Volcanic" –  Co-writing
 "Loops" –  Co-writing

2011
One Direction Up All Night – Syco Music
 "I Want" – Programmer,

Wretch 32 Black & White Deluxe Edition – Ministry of Sound
 "Air" feat Owen Cutts – Producer, co-writer

2012
Meg Myers Daughter in the Choir – Atlantic Records
 "Monster (Semothy Jones Remix)" – Producer, co-writer

Remixes

2007
Sosa feat Jim Jones "Promo"
 "I'm Getting Money – Semothy Jones Remix"

Plan B "No Good Promo Vinyl"
 "No Good – Prodigal Son Remix" – Producer, composer

Kate Nash "Promo"
 "Caroline – Semothy Jones Mashup"

2009
Little Boots New in Town Promo
 "New in Town – Semothy & Sheldrake Remix"

Lady Sovereign "So Human CD Single B Side"
 "So Human – Soggy Face Remix" – Producer, composer
 "I Got You Dancing – Semothy Jones Remix" – Producer, composer

2010
Operator Please Logic EP
 "Logic – Semothy Jones Remix"

Promo/mixtape productions
Plan B Paint It Blacker
 Cast A Light – Producer, co-writer
 Suzanne – Co-producer, co-writer
 Who Needs Actions When You Got Words – Producer, co-writer

Frisco Various
 Mash Up The Party ft Sway – Producer, co-writer
 Darkside – Producer, co-writer
 "The Best in the Game ft Wiley – Producer, co-Writer

Goldielocks Hardknock Compilation
 Lil' bit of Liquor – Producer, co-writer

S.A.S Various
 Shake 'n' Break ft Ransom – Producer, co-writer

References

External links
 Semothy Jones official site
 Semothy Jones on Twitter

1981 births
Living people
English record producers
English songwriters
People from Islington (district)
English people of Welsh descent
English people of Dutch descent
Musicians from London